Jufureh (also spelled Juffureh or Juffure) is a town in the Gambia, 30 kilometers inland on the north bank of the River Gambia in the North Bank Division near James Island. The town is home to a museum and Fort Jillifree.

Jufureh is known for its appearance in Alex Haley's 1976 novel Roots: The Saga of an American Family, as the birthplace of Haley's ancestor Kunta Kinte. After the publication of Roots, Jufureh became a significant tourist destination. This led to economic benefits for the town, including the construction of an elementary school, a new market aimed at tourists, and improved roads.

In 1651 a small plot of land from the village was leased by Jacob Kettler, the Duke of Courland, from the king of Kombo, as part of the Couronian colonization of Africa.

At some point, Jufureh became part of the Kingdom of Niumi and by the 18th century, the town had become a location central to the African exportation of slaves to Europeans during the Atlantic slave trade. The town took part in the revolt that the Marabout launched in the 1860s against the Niumi king Buntung Jamme and as a result, the town was razed by Jamme's forces in an attempt to suppress the revolt. 

Demographically, the predominant religion in the village is Islam. In 1999, a mosque and school, the Alex Haley Mosque and School Complex, was opened in Jufureh, where Haley traced back his ancestry through genealogical research.

There is a sign at the entrance of the village (sponsored by Gambian government and World Bank) that declares Jufureh a "baby friendly community".

References

External links
 Jufureh photos, Information & Roots Story

Populated places in the Gambia
Former colonies of Courland
Gambia River
North Bank Division